Feldbach is the name of several places:

 Feldbach, Switzerland, a village near Rapperswil, Switzerland
 Feldbach, Haut-Rhin, a commune in the Haut-Rhin département, France
 Feldbach, Styria, a city in Austria